Steve Aggers (born May 31, 1948) is an American retired college basketball coach. He is best known for his tenures as head coach of NCAA Division I programs at Eastern Washington and Loyola Marymount.

Aggers was hired as head coach at Eastern Washington after assistant coaching stints at Pepperdine and Kansas State under Tom Asbury. He had previously been head coach at Wayne State in Nebraska and the University of Great Falls. He led the Eagles to their first Big Sky Conference title in school history in 2000.

He was hired as head coach at Loyola Marymount University in 2000. He was fired in 2005 after an 11–17 season in 2004–05. 

In 2006, Aggers was hired as head coach of the Great Falls Explorers of the Continental Basketball Association (CBA).

References

External links
Coaching record @ sports-reference.com

1948 births
Living people
American men's basketball coaches
American men's basketball players
Basketball coaches from Wyoming
Basketball players from Wyoming
Chadron State Eagles men's basketball players
College men's basketball head coaches in the United States
Continental Basketball Association coaches
Eastern Washington Eagles men's basketball coaches
Junior college men's basketball coaches in the United States
Junior college men's basketball players in the United States
Kansas State Wildcats men's basketball coaches
Loyola Marymount Lions men's basketball coaches
People from Laramie, Wyoming
Pepperdine Waves men's basketball coaches
Providence Argonauts men's basketball coaches
Wayne State Wildcats men's basketball coaches
Wyoming Cowboys basketball coaches